Biopterin-dependent aromatic amino acid hydroxylases (AAAH) are a family of aromatic amino acid hydroxylase enzymes which includes phenylalanine 4-hydroxylase, tyrosine 3-hydroxylase, and tryptophan 5-hydroxylase. These enzymes primarily hydroxylate the amino acids L-phenylalanine, L-tyrosine, and L-tryptophan, respectively. 

The AAAH enzymes are functionally and structurally related proteins which act as rate-limiting catalysts for important metabolic pathways. Each AAAH enzyme contains iron and catalyzes the ring hydroxylation of aromatic amino acids using tetrahydrobiopterin (BH4) as a substrate.  The AAAH enzymes are regulated by phosphorylation at serines in their N-termini.

Role in metabolism

In humans, phenylalanine hydroxylase deficiency can cause phenylketonuria, the most common inborn error of amino acid metabolism.

Structure

It has been suggested that the AAAH enzymes each contain a conserved C-terminal catalytic (C) domain and an unrelated N-terminal regulatory (R) domain. It is possible that the R protein domains arose from genes that were recruited from different sources to combine with the common gene for the catalytic core. Thus, by combining with the same C domain, the proteins acquired the unique regulatory properties of the separate R domains.

References

Protein domains